Kuhar is a surname in some Slavic languages literally meaning "cook". Notable people with the surname include:

Alojzij Kuhar, Slovenian and Yugoslav politician, diplomat, historian, and journalist
Michael J. Kuhar
Nejc Kuhar

Slavic-language surnames